An cyclocycloid is a roulette traced by a point attached to a circle of radius r rolling around, a fixed circle of radius R, where the point is at a distance d from the center of the exterior circle.

The parametric equations for a cyclocycloid are

where  is a parameter (not the polar angle). And r can be positive or negative depending on whether it is of an Epicycloid or Hypocycloid variety.

The classic Spirograph toy traces out these curves.

See also
 Centered trochoid
 Cycloid
 Epicycloid
 Hypocycloid
 Spirograph

External links

Plane curves